Vasilije Đerić (1867–1931) was a Serbian historian and ethnographer. He hailed from Lika (in modern Croatia). He was a professor of Old Greek language and literature in the University of Belgrade. He contributed to the Journal of the Ethnographic Museum in Belgrade.

Work

See also
 Panta Srećković
 Miloš Milojević
 Tihomir Đorđević
 Spiridon Gopčević
 Jovan Cvijić

References

1867 births
1931 deaths
20th-century Serbian historians
University of Belgrade people
Serbian ethnographers
People from the Kingdom of Serbia
People of the Kingdom of Yugoslavia
Serbs of Croatia
Yugoslav ethnographers